This is an overview of streets and roads in the city of Cologne. It includes a list of notable streets, for historic, transportation or other reasons and is to present an understanding of the city's road systems. The scope of this article does not cover the city's public squares.

Innenstadt streets
This is a list of some notable streets in Innenstadt, Cologne.

Streets and alleys in Altstadt

Streets in Neustadt

Streets in Deutz

Principal ring roads
The city of Cologne possesses one of the most comprehensive urban ring road systems. The beltways were laid out during the end of the 19th and the early 20th century and today are still being complemented and extended. Their development originated in the work of architects and urban designers such as Karl Henrici, Josef Stübben and Fritz Schumacher as well as former Cologne mayors Hermann Heinrich Becker and Konrad Adenauer.

Cologne Ring

The Cologne Ring ( or plural ) is a semi-circular, some 6 km long urban boulevard in Innenstadt, Cologne and the city's busiest and most prominent street system. The Cologne Ring is a four-lane street and part of Bundesstraße 9.

The ring sections between Barbarossaplatz and Ebertplatz are some of the busiest streets in Cologne.

Innere Kanalstraße
Innere Kanalstraße is part of a ring road system, which spans from Vorgebirgstraße in the south-west to Zoobrücke in the north-east. Innere Kanalstraße and Universitätsstraße are the longest of these streets and follow the outside outline of the Cologne Green Belt (German: Kölner Grüngürtel). They therefore encircle the district of Innenstadt to the west and north-west. These are mostly six-lane roads and follow the Inner Ring almost concentrically. Kanal- and Universitätsstraße are a major relief of traffic load on the Inner Ring. Landmarks on Universitätsstraße are the University, after which the street is named, and the Aachener Weiher with the Museum of East Asian Art. Landmarks on Innere Kanalstraße are the Colonius telecommunication tower and the Herkules tower.

Cologne Belt

The Cologne Belt (German: Kölner Gürtel) is a system of ring roads which runs through the Left-Rhenish districts of Cologne. The sections of the Cologne Belt are mostly defined by the large arterial roads running perpendicular to them and are named after the districts and city parts they pass through. The Cologne Belt was set up in the early 20th century and is somewhat concentric to Kanal- and Universitätsstraße and the Cologne Inner Ring.

Militärringstraße
Only a minor street today, the Militärringstraße once had significance for the fortifications of Cologne during the 19th and early 20th century.

Cologne Beltway

The Cologne Beltway (German: Kölner Autobahnring) is the generic term for the Autobahns encircling Cologne. It consists of the Bundesautobahn 3, the Bundesautobahn 4 and the Bundesautobahn 1. With an average of 160,000 cars per day on the BAB 3 and 100,000 on A4 and A1, the beltway handles one of the highest traffic volumes in Germany.

The beltway crosses the Rhine at Leverkusen Bridge in the north and Cologne Rodenkirchen Bridge in the south. The Autobahns on the beltway cross Bundesautobahn 559, Bundesautobahn 555 and Bundesautobahn 57. The Bundesautobahn 59 is tied to the beltway at the interchange Leverkusen-West in the north and to Dreieck Heumar in the south. Cologne/Bonn Airport lies on the Bundesautobahn 59.

Principal arterial roads

In the following a list of arterial roads, starting clockwise in the North-East. The names of some roads indicate the city or direction, they lead towards.

Right-Rhenish arterial roads all start in Deutz. Deutz is a city part of Innenstadt. Left-Rhenish arterial roads mostly start at the Cologne Ring. Of the major arterial roads, only Dürener Straße and the BAB 57 start on Universitätsstraße and Innere Kanalstraße respectively. Konrad-Adenauer-Ufer is a river embankment road, leading further into the center up to Hohenzollern Bridge.

Right-Rhenish arterial roads

Left-Rhenish arterial roads

See also
 Transportation in Cologne

References

Bibliography

External links

 Information about the Cologne Beltway at Straßenbau NRW
 Index of Streets in Cologne

 
Cologne
Cologne
Streets